Blue River is a village in Grant County, Wisconsin, United States. The population was 434 at the 2010 census.

Places
Eagle Cave is near Blue River.

Geography
Blue River is located at  (43.186952, -90.570131).

Demographics

2010 census
As of the census of 2010, there were 434 people, 192 households, and 113 families living in the village. The racial makeup of the village was 96.5% White, 0.7% African American, 0.5% Native American, 0.7% Asian, 0.7% from other races, and 0.9% from two or more races. Hispanic or Latino of any race were 1.8% of the population.

There were 192 households, of which 30.7% had children under the age of 18 living with them, 44.3% were married couples living together, 6.8% had a female householder with no husband present, 7.8% had a male householder with no wife present, and 41.1% were non-families. 32.8% of all households were made up of individuals, and 14.6% had someone living alone who was 65 years of age or older. The average household size was 2.26 and the average family size was 2.88.

The median age in the village was 42.1 years. 23.7% of residents were under the age of 18; 6.9% were between the ages of 18 and 24; 23.7% were from 25 to 44; 29.6% were from 45 to 64; and 16.1% were 65 years of age or older. The gender makeup of the village was 51.4% male and 48.6% female.

2000 census
As of the census of 2000, there were 429 people, 183 households, and 116 families living in the village. The population density was 577.8 people per square mile (223.8/km2). There were 205 housing units at an average density of 276.1 per square mile (107.0/km2). The racial makeup of the village was 99.77% White and 0.23% Asian. Hispanic or Latino of any race were 0.23% of the population.

There were 183 households, out of which 30.1% had children under the age of 18 living with them, 49.7% were married couples living together, 9.3% had a female householder with no husband present, and 36.1% were non-families. 33.3% of all households were made up of individuals, and 18.0% had someone living alone who was 65 years of age or older. The average household size was 2.34 and the average family size was 2.97.

In the village, the population was spread out, with 24.9% under the age of 18, 9.6% from 18 to 24, 26.3% from 25 to 44, 23.1% from 45 to 64, and 16.1% who were 65 years of age or older. The median age was 38 years. For every 100 females, there were 107.2 males. For every 100 females age 18 and over, there were 100.0 males.

The median income for a household in the village was $34,250, and the median income for a family was $41,806. Males had a median income of $30,515 versus $20,625 for females. The per capita income for the village was $16,548. About 3.5% of families and 8.6% of the population were below the poverty line, including 7.5% of those under age 18 and 15.1% of those age 65 or over.

Gallery

Notable people
Doug Adams, baseball player
Constance Kies, nutrition scientist and dietician

External Links

https://commons.wikimedia.org/wiki/Category:Blue_River,_Wisconsin

References

Villages in Grant County, Wisconsin
Villages in Wisconsin